The 2016–17 Western Michigan Broncos men's basketball team represented Western Michigan University during the 2016–17 NCAA Division I men's basketball season. The Broncos, led by 14th-year head coach Steve Hawkins, played their home games at University Arena as members of the West Division of the Mid-American Conference. They finished the season 16–16, 11–7 in MAC play to tie for first in the West Division. As the No. 5 seed in the MAC tournament, they lost in the quarterfinals of the conference tournament to Ball State. They declined invitations from both the CollegeInsider.com and College Basketball Invitational postseason tournaments.

Previous season
The Broncos finished the 2015–16 season 13–19 overall and 7–11 in MAC play to finish in last place in the West Division. They lost in the first round of the MAC tournament to Northern Illinois. WMU tied Eastern Michigan for the Michigan MAC Trophy with a 3–1 record. However, due to not having a clear winner, Central Michigan retained the trophy that they won in 2014–15.

Departures

Recruiting class of 2016

Recruiting class of 2017

Season
On December 12, during the season, redshirt freshman guard Joeviair Kennedy was charged with murder and armed robbery in the killing of a WMU student.

Roster

Schedule and results
The following table lists WMU's schedule.

|-
!colspan=9 style=| Exhibition game

|-
!colspan=9 style=| Non-conference regular season

|-
! colspan=9 style=| MAC regular season

|-
!colspan=9 style=| MAC tournament

See also
 2016–17 Western Michigan Broncos women's basketball team

References

Western Michigan
Western Michigan Broncos men's basketball seasons